Answers to Nothing is the second solo studio album by Scottish musician Midge Ure, released on 22 August 1988 by Chrysalis Records. It was the first release by Ure following the demise of Ultravox.

Background
Ure wrote, produced and recorded all the songs round 10 months in his 24-track home studio. As a solo artist, Ure only hit the singles chart once in America with the single "Dear God". It reached No. 95 on the Billboard Hot 100, No. 6 on the US Billboard Mainstream Rock chart and at No. 4 on the US Billboard Alternative Music chart in 1989. He filmed the music video to "Dear God" in Los Angeles.

The album had an provenance in that it grew out of the broadening of Ure's social consciousness during the past four years. It was a development out of the personal scale to the global. He was forever changed by his involvement with Live Aid. He actually accompanied the first shipment made to Ethiopia. His direct confrontation with the conditions of starvation and death was the most powerful experience of his life. In addition, his recent embrace of marriage and fatherhood had only reinforced his commitment to caring about the state of the world. All of these changes had found their way into his work.

Bob Clearmountain mixed the whole album in a week at Air Studios in Montserrat.

The track "Sister and Brother" was a duet with Kate Bush. In 1982, Ure had appeared onstage with Kate Bush while she performed live onstage during the Prince's Trust Rock Gala. After Ure's approach, Bush said she'd send a vocal contribution back if she had time. ”I wasn’t expecting Kate to do anything at all, or that she’d take months if she could help,” Midge Ure admitted, ”Then she phoned up a week later and said: ‘I’ve done something, do you want to come to my studio to hear it?”. Having turned her vocals around so quickly, Ure was ready for Bush's contribution to be two or three lines; probably her sister character answering the brother's questions. Instead, Bush had multi-tracked the vocals with effects Ure called: “all these wonderful Kateisms”, including a choral section at the end of the song. ‘It was glorious,” said Ure. ”My only regret is that I didn’t see Kate at work to see how she’d done it. Hearing someone like Kate Bush pour their heart and soul into one of my songs was an incredible affirmation. It was, ’Well done you, we’re giving you a gold star for your essay.’ I was shocked she’d taken so much time and effort.”

Having that mutual respect from someone so highly regarded helped convince Ure he was following the right path. He said: ”I realised I didn’t have to be aiming for three-minute pop songs, that I could make pieces of music I love, even if nobody else gets it.”

The track "Homeland" was written about Phil Lynott, who had died two years prior to when the album was released.

After the first Band Aid shipment to Ethiopia, the sights, sounds and smells of the starving and dying left an imprint on his subconscious that have found expression on the album in songs like "Hell to Heaven" and "Dear God".

Ure said in an interview 2015 about Dear God: 

Ure said about bassist Mick Karn:

Ure said in 1988 about the album:

Track listing

Personnel
Midge Ure – guitars, keyboards, vocals
Mark King – bass on "Answers to Nothing", "Sister and Brother" and "Just for You"
Steve Brzezicki – bass on "Take Me Home", "Dear God" and "Lied"
Mark Brzezicki – drums on "Answers to Nothing", "Dear God", "Just for You", and "Remembrance Day"
Mick Karn – bass on "Remembrance Day"
Kate Bush – vocals on "Sister and Brother"
Robbie Kilgore – additional keyboards
Craig Armstrong – piano on "Sister and Brother"
Ali Campbell, Robin Campbell, Yona Dunsford, Carol Douet – backing vocals on "Sister and Brother"
Peter Saville Associates – design

Notes

External links

1988 albums
Midge Ure albums
Albums produced by Midge Ure
Chrysalis Records albums